Judy Klein (born 14 April 1943, in Chicago) is an American composer, music educator. She is the founder of the Computer Music Studio at New York University and served as its director in 1980's. Her music is primarily acousmatic, and includes works for the electronic medium, sound installations, music for theatre and collaborations with visual artists.

Education
Judy Klein earned her Bachelor in Arts at the University of California, Berkeley (1967), and continued her studies at the Music Academy in Basel, Switzerland (Diploma, 1977). She graduated with a Master of Arts degree from New York University (1987), after studying with Thomas Kessler, Reynold Weidenaar, Lilli Friedemann and Ruth Anderson. She continued her studies in computer generated music at the Brooklyn College Center for Computer Music with Charles Dodge.

Musical career 
Klein began teaching electro-acoustic music composition at New York University (SEHNAP) in 1985, and later founded and directed the New York University Computer Music studio. She has served as a consultant for the New York Public Library for the Performing Arts (Lincoln Center) where she worked to create the Library's Archive of Electro-Acoustic Music(1990 -2006). She has been an artist-in-residence at places such as Bregman Studio at Dartmouth College, The Brooklyn College Center for Computer Music, Elektronische Musik Studio in Basle, Switzerland, Institute of Electroacoustic Music (Bourges, France), and guest composer and lecturer at Brooklyn College Center for Computer Music, the Cincinnati College Conservatory, and the Computer Music Center at Columbia University, among others. 

Klein composes almost exclusively in the C programming language and the C sound computer music language. Her works are primarily acousmatic and increasingly combine her interest in sound with her commitment to animal rights, which she speaks about in an interview with Peter Shea about her piece “The Wolves of Bays Mountain”, as well as other aspects of her work. She currently resides in New York City and serves on juries and selections committees for electroacoustic music competitions, festivals and conferences. She is a member of the Steering Committee for the New York City Electroacoustic Music Festival and is a contributing editor for The Open Space Magazine and for Perspectives of New Music. Her music is recorded on ICMA, SEAMUS, Cuneiform and Open Space compact discs.

Musical works
Selected works include:

 Dead End (1979) - tape
 Little Piece (1979) - tape
 Dream/Song (1980) - tape
 Journeys (1982) - tape, art installation; collaboration with B. Nathan
 God Bites (1983) - tape
 The Mines of Falun, pt 1 (1983) - tape
 The Tell-Tale Heart (1983) - film score; directed by H. Marti
 From the Journals of Felix Bosonnet (1987) - tape; Performed at the 1989 International Computer Music Conference
 Elements 1.1: sulphur, phosphorus; diamond (1992) - tape
 88” for Nick (1992) - tape
 Elements 1.2 (1993) - sound installation; collaboration with C. Furukawa and N. Yatsuyanagi
 The Wolves of Bays Mountain (1998) - tape
 Railcar (2008)

Discography 

 The Wolves of Bays Mountain, OPEN SPACE 15 #OS015 - 2004
 From the Journals of Felix Bosonnet, ICMC 1989 #38161665; Christoph Gaugler, reader - 1989

 88” for Nick, Transforms: The Nerve Events Project, Cuneiform Records #43302512- 1993
 Elements 1.1: sulphur, phosphorus; diamond, Music from SEAMUS vol. 4 (digital re-issue from 1994) - 2022
 Railcar, Music from SEAMUS vol. 20 - 2011

External links 

 From the Journals of Felix Bosonnet, ICMC 1989 #38161665; Christoph Gaugler, reader - 1989
 88” for Nick, Transforms: The Nerve Events Project, Cuneiform Records #43302512- 1993
 Norman, Katharine. Before and After Listening to Judy Klein's The Wolves of Bays Mountain, Open Space magazine, issue 6/Fall 2004.
 The Wolves of Bays Mountain, OPEN SPACE 15 #OS015 - 2004
 Railcar, Music from SEAMUS vol. 20 - 2011
 Judy Klein, Composer, on her Music, February 2013

 Helmuth, Mara. Sound and Video Anthology: Program Notes, Computer Music Journal 43 (4): pp. 110-120. 2019. 
 Elements 1.1: sulphur, phosphorus; diamond, Music from SEAMUS vol. 4 (digital re-issue from 1994) - 2022 
 Judy Klein's electropresense

Further reading 
 Norman, Katharine. Before and After Listening to Judy Klein’s The Wolves of Bays Mountain. Open Space magazine, issue 6,  2004.
 Hinkle -Turner, Elizabeth. Women Composers and Music Technology in the United States: Crossing the Line, England, USA: Ashgate Publishing Limited. pp.55-58, p.81. 2006.
 Helmuth, Mara. Sound and Video Anthology: Program Notes, Computer Music Journal 43 (4): p.110, 113. 2019.

References

1943 births
20th-century American composers
20th-century American women musicians
20th-century classical composers
American classical composers
American women classical composers
American music educators
American women music educators
American women in electronic music
Brooklyn College alumni
Living people
20th-century women composers
21st-century American women